Tatran Stadium (Štadión Tatran Prešov  in Slovak) is a multi-purpose stadium in Prešov, Slovakia. It is not currently used for any of football matches, because its expected reconstruction . The stadium new capacity should be 6,500 spectators (all seated) after reconstruction. The stadium old capacity was 5,410 spectators (all seated).

History
The first playing field was built in 1899. In 1907, the stadium had a capacity of 400 people. During the World War II bombing, the stadium was damaged and burned out. In 1945-47 new tribunes with 4500 seats were built. In 1994, the capacity was increased to 7900, later to 14000. Due to renovation work in 2009 the capacity was then decreased to 5,410 (all seats).

2017-unknown reconstruction
Between 2017–?, the current stadium will be replaced by new modern all-sitting arena with capacity of 6,500 spectators.

Owners
Tatran Futbal arena is owned by the city of Prešov and Prešovský samosprávny kraj.

Cost
The cost of the reconstruction is €4 million. Slovak government provided €2.4 million of the cost. City of Prešov and Prešovský samosprávny kraj provided €1.6 million.

International matches
Tatran Stadium has hosted one friendly match of the Slovakia national football team.

External links
Stadium Database Article
Football stadiums profile

References

Stadium
Football venues in Slovakia
Stadium
Multi-purpose stadiums in Slovakia
Prešov
Tourist attractions in Prešov Region
Sports venues completed in 1907
1907 establishments in Austria-Hungary